Alex Farmer may refer to: 

 Alex Farmer (bishop) (born 1966), American Anglican bishop
 Alex Farmer (baseball) (1877–1920), American professional baseball player

See also 

 Alec Farmer